The 1994–95 Copa México is the 65th staging of the Copa México, the 38th staging in the professional era after an absence of 2 years.

The competition started on January 24, 1995, and concluded on March 15, 1995, with the final, in which Necaxa lifted the trophy for third time ever with a 2–0 victory over Veracruz.

For this edition was played by 38 teams, between Primera División and Primera División A.

First round

|}

Second round

|}

Necaxa Bye to Semifinal

Third round

|}

Club América Bye to Semifinal

Quarterfinals

|}

Semifinals

|}

Final

|}

References
Mexico - Statistics of Copa México in season 1994/1995. (RSSSF)

Copa MX
Cup
Club Necaxa
1994–95 domestic association football cups